Yuvraj Singh is an Indian politician belonging to Bharatiya Janata Party. He was elected as MLA of the Hamirpur constituency in the Uttar Pradesh Legislative Assembly on 27 September 2019.

References

Living people
Bharatiya Janata Party politicians from Uttar Pradesh
Members of the Uttar Pradesh Legislative Assembly
Year of birth missing (living people)